The Gūr-i Amīr or Guri Amir is a mausoleum of the Turco-Mongol conqueror Timur (also known as Tamerlane) in Samarkand, Uzbekistan. It occupies an important place in the history of Central Asian Architecture as the precursor for and had influence on later Great Mughal architecture tombs, including Gardens of Babur in Kabul, Humayun's Tomb in Delhi and the Taj Mahal in Agra, built by Timur's Indian descendants, Turco-Mongols that followed Indian culture with Central Asian influences, Mughals established the ruling Mughal dynasty of  the Indian subcontinent. The mausoleum has been heavily restored.

Construction 

Gur-e Amir is Persian for "Tomb of the King". This architectural complex with its azure dome contains the tombs of Tamerlane, his sons Shah Rukh and Miran Shah and grandsons Ulugh Beg and Muhammad Sultan. Also honoured with a place in the tomb is Timur's teacher Sayyid Baraka.

The earliest part of the complex was built at the end of the 14th century by the orders of Muhammad Sultan. Now only the foundations of the madrasah and khanaka, the entrance portal and a part of one of four minarets remains.

The construction of the mausoleum itself began in 1403 after the sudden death of Muhammad Sultan, Tamerlane's heir apparent and his beloved grandson, for whom it was intended. Timur had built himself a smaller tomb in Shahrisabz near his Ak-Saray palace. However, when Timur died in 1405 on campaign on his military expedition to China, the passes to Shahrisabz were snowed in, so he was buried here instead. Ulugh Beg, another grandson of Tamerlane, completed the work. During his reign the mausoleum became the family crypt of the Timurid dynasty.

Architecture 

The entrance portal to the Muhammad Sultan ensemble is richly decorated with carved bricks and various mosaics. All the extensions of Ulugh Beg's time are attributed to the architect Muhammad ibn Mahmud from Isfahan.

Outwardly the Gur-e Amir Mausoleum is a one-cupola building. It is famous for its simplicity of construction and for its solemn monumentality of appearance. It is an octahedral building crowned by an azure fluted dome. The exterior decoration of the walls consists of the blue, light-blue and white tiles organized into geometrical and epigraphic ornaments against a background of terracotta bricks. The dome (diameter – 15 m (49.21 ft), height – 12.5 m (41.01 ft)) is of a bright blue color with deep rosettes and white spots. Heavy ribbed fluting gives an amazing expressiveness to the cupola.

During the reign of Ulugh Beg a doorway was made to provide an entrance into the mausoleum.

Inwardly the mausoleum appears as a large, high chamber with deep niches at the sides and diverse decoration. The lower part of the walls covered are by onyx slabs composed as one panel. Each of these slabs is decorated with refined paintings. Above the panel there is a marble stalactite cornice. Large expanses of the walls are decorated with painted plaster; the arches and the internal dome are ornamented by high-relief papier-mache cartouches, gilded and painted.

The ornate carved headstones in the inner room of the mausoleum merely indicate the location of the actual tombs in a crypt directly underneath the main chamber. Under Ulugh Beg's government a solid block of dark green jade was placed over the grave of Tamerlane. Formerly this stone had been used at a place of worship in the Chinese emperor's palace, then as the throne of Duwa (a descendant of Genghis Khan) in Chagatay Khanate. Next to Tamerlane's grave lie the marble tombstones of his sons Miran Shah and Shah Rukh and also of grandsons – Muhammad Sultan and Ulugh Beg. Tamerlane's spiritual teacher Mir Said Baraka, also rests here.

Subsequent history 

In 1740, king Nader Shah of the Afsharid Empire tried to carry away Tamerlane's sarcophagus. Nader idolized Timur. He imitated Timur's military prowess and, later in his reign, Timur's cruelty, but in the process of removal the sarcophagus broke in two. This was interpreted as a bad omen. His advisers urged him to return the stone to its rightful place.

Unfortunately, after the end of 17th century Samarkand suffered a long period of decline. The city lost the status of capital which transferred to Bukhara. The great Silk Road bypassed the city and its great historical monuments stood empty and forgotten. Only after the Second World War did extensive restoration work in Gur-Emir begin. In the 1950s the dome, main portal and minarets were refurbished. By that time the majolica tiles had mostly fallen away. In the 1970s, the restoration of the interior was undertaken. Neither the Madrasah nor the Khanaka of initial Muhammad Sultan's complex were reconstructed at that time. With the resurgence of the interest in Tamerlane after the founding of the Republic of Uzbekistan in 1991, care of his places of worship has intensified.

Tamerlane's tomb was opened shortly before the German invasion of the Soviet Union, 19 June 1941. The exhumation of Timur in 1941 was made under the direction of Soviet scientist and anthropologist Mikhail Mikhaylovich Gerasimov, who was able to reconstruct Tamerlane's facial features from his skull, and it was also confirmed that he was 172 cm (5′ 7¾″ in imperial) in height and would have walked with a pronounced limp.

Curse of Timur 
When Soviet scientists wanted to open Tamerlane's tomb, rumors went around Samarkand that opening the tomb would curse those who opened it. Local leaders attempted to warn the excavation team of the "risks".

The tomb is inscribed with two warnings that read "When I Rise From the Dead, The World Shall Tremble". Allegedly, once opened another inscription was discovered: “Whosoever Disturbs My Tomb Will Unleash an Invader More Terrible than I". Even though people close to Gerasimov claim that this story is a fabrication, the legend persists.

The tomb was opened by Mikhail Mikhaylovich Gerasimov, a Soviet archaeologist on 20 June 1941, two days before the start of Operation Barbarossa.

Apparently, Stalin believed in the curse and ordered Timur be reburied. According to legend, the remains of Timur were taken to the frontlines of Stalingrad to inspire the Muslim troops in the Red Army. Tamerlane was reburied with full Islamic burial rites on December 20, 1942, about one month before the Soviet victory at Stalingrad (though by this time the German Army at Stalingrad was already encircled).

Nearby monuments 

Some consider the Gur-e Amir, Ruhabad mausoleum and Aksaray mausoleum to be a combined ensemble because of their closeness.

Ruhabad (14th century) is a small mausoleum and is said to contain a hair of the Islamic prophet Muhammad. The one-story madrasah now accommodates craftsmens' shops. There is a functioning mosque next door to the madrasah. All three combine into one ensemble.

The Aksaray mausoleum (15th century), recently restored, is located on a quiet street behind Gur-e Amir.

See also 

 Registan
 Bibi-Khanym Mosque
 Shah-i-Zinda
 Tourism in Uzbekistan
 History of Persian domes

References

Sources 
 Gur Emir complex, Rukhobod, Aksaray mausoleums. Information, photos, location

External links 
 Samarkand – the Capital of Tamerlane
 
 Square Kufic decoration on the Gur-i Emir complex

Photo gallery 

Buildings and structures completed in the 15th century
Timur
Mausoleums in Uzbekistan
Buildings and structures in Samarkand
Burial sites of the Timurid dynasty
Cemeteries in Uzbekistan